This is a list of notable manufacturers of studio monitors. This list is not exhaustive; every entry must have an article written in the English Wikipedia.

Current manufacturers

See also 
 Lists of companies
 List of bass amplifier and loudspeaker manufacturers
 List of loudspeaker manufacturers